The Tommy Hanlon Show is an Australian television series which aired 1967 to 1968 on the Nine Network. It was a game show similar to Let's Make a Deal, and aired in a daytime half-hour time-slot. As the title suggests, it was hosted by Tommy Hanlon Jr., an American who found popularity with Australian viewers during the 1960s.

Episode status
The exact archival status of the show is not known, given the wiping of the era. Two episodes are held by the National Film and Sound Archive, a nighttime edition and a daytime edition with Mike Dyer hosting as Hanlon was in hospital.

References

External links

1960s Australian game shows
1967 Australian television series debuts
1968 Australian television series endings
Nine Network original programming
Black-and-white Australian television shows
English-language television shows